László Fidel (born June 29, 1965) is a Hungarian sprint canoer who competed from the late 1980s to the early 1990s. He won a silver medal in the K-4 1000 m event at the 1992 Summer Olympics in Barcelona.

Fidel also won a total of six medals at the ICF Canoe Sprint World Championships with five golds (K-2 500 m: 1987, K-4 1000 m: 1986, 1987, 1990, 1991) and a silver (K-4 500 m: 1991).

References

External links
 
 

1965 births
Living people
Hungarian male canoeists
ICF Canoe Sprint World Championships medalists in kayak
Olympic canoeists of Hungary
Olympic silver medalists for Hungary
Olympic medalists in canoeing
Canoeists at the 1992 Summer Olympics
Medalists at the 1992 Summer Olympics
20th-century Hungarian people